Marshall College was the name of Marshall University in Huntington, West Virginia, before it was granted university status in 1961.

Marshall College can also refer to:
 Franklin & Marshall College in Lancaster, Pennsylvania
 Thurgood Marshall College at the University of California, San Diego
 Cleveland-Marshall College of Law as Cleveland State University
 College of the Marshall Islands in Uliga, Republic of the Marshall Islands
 Pronunciation of Marischal College, Aberdeen
 Marshall University Graduate College in South Charleston, West Virginia
 A fictional college where Indiana Jones teaches